The House Without Men (German: Das Haus ohne Männer) is a 1928 German silent comedy film directed by Rolf Randolf and starring Ossi Oswalda, Iwa Wanja and Ida Renard.

The film's art direction was by Heinrich Richter.

Cast
 Ossi Oswalda as Eva  
 Iwa Wanja as Friedel  
 Ida Renard as Elisa  
 Valeria Blanka as Tamara  
 Ibolya Szekely as Marianne  
 Livio Pavanelli as Ralf  
 Hans Brausewetter as Lothar  
 Fritz Kampers as Der Nachtwächter  
 Gyula Szőreghy as Der Direktor  
 Bruno Arno as Der Tanzmeister  
 Trude Lehmann as Die Köchin

References

Bibliography
 Alfred Krautz. International directory of cinematographers, set- and costume designers in film, Volume 4. Saur, 1984.

External links

1928 films
Films of the Weimar Republic
German silent feature films
Films directed by Rolf Randolf
German black-and-white films
German comedy films
1928 comedy films